John Johnston House is a historic home located near Yanceyville, Caswell County, North Carolina.  It was built about 1825, and is a two-story, three bay by two bay, hall-and-parlor plan frame dwelling with Federal style architectural details. A one-story rear ell was added in 1990.  It was moved 150 yards to its present location about 1921.

It was added to the National Register of Historic Places in 1997.

References

Houses on the National Register of Historic Places in North Carolina
Federal architecture in North Carolina
Houses completed in 1825
Houses in Caswell County, North Carolina
National Register of Historic Places in Caswell County, North Carolina